General elections were held in Uganda on 14 January 2021 to elect the President and the Parliament. The Electoral Commission announced Incumbent President Yoweri Museveni, the incumbent ruling since 1986, as the winner with 58.64% of the votes although the U.S. State Department qualified the electoral process as "fundamentally flawed" and Africa Elections Watch said they observed irregularities. The official voter turnout was 57% but is questioned since 409 polling stations have been announced to have 100% voter turnout.

Electoral system
The President of Uganda is elected using the two-round system, with candidates needing to receive at least 50% of the vote to be elected in the first round. Chapter 142 of the Presidential Elections Act of 2000 stipulates that presidential candidates must be a citizen of Uganda by birth and be qualified to be an MP. Candidates are also required to be of sound mind and have no formal connection with the Electoral Commission of Uganda. Term limits were abolished in 2005. The elections are supervised by the Electoral Commission of Uganda.

The Parliament of Uganda has a total of 529 seats, including 353 representatives elected using first-past-the-post voting in single winner constituencies. Using the same method, 146 seats reserved for women are filled, with one seat per district. Finally, 30 seats are indirectly filled via special electoral colleges: 10 by the army, 5 by youths, 5 by elders, 5 by unions, and 5 by people with disabilities. In each of these groups, at least one woman must be elected (at least two for the army group).

Presidential candidates
Eleven candidates were registered to contest in the election.
 Yoweri Museveni, National Resistance Movement
 Bobi Wine, National Unity Platform
 John Katumba, Independent
 Willy Mayambala, Independent
 Fred Mwesigye, Independent
 Henry Tumukunde, Independent
 Joseph Kabuleta, Independent
 Nancy Kalembe, Independent
 Patrick Oboi Amuriat, Forum for Democratic Change
 Mugisha Muntu, Alliance for National Transformation
 Norbert Mao, Democratic Party

Campaign
Campaigning was stopped in Mbarara, Kabarole, Luweero, Kasese, Masaka, Wakiso, Jinja, Kalungu, Kazo, Kampala City and Tororo on 26 December 2020. The government said it was to prevent spread of the COVID-19 pandemic, but critics said it was because of the popularity of the opposition in those areas. Crowds had previously been limited to 200 people.

When asked what he wanted to accomplish that he hadn't already done after 35 years in power, Museveni said he wanted to work for the economic integration in Africa, and to change the Ugandan culture of not working hard. He said in other countries, a harsh environment or competition pushed people to work, "but here, fools can survive".

Conduct

International observers
The European Union did not deploy observers (EOM—election observer mission) because previous recommendations from their 2016 mission had been ignored. On 13 January 2021, the United States cancelled its observation of Uganda's presidential election, saying the voting will lack transparency and accountability.

Arrests of Bobi Wine
On 18 November 2020, opposition candidate Bobi Wine was arrested for allegedly violating COVID-19 protocols during his presidential campaign in Uganda. The National Unity Platform claimed that the continued arrests of its members were intended to stifle their ability to campaign rather than to follow COVID protocols. Supporters of Wine took to the streets of Kampala, clashing with security forces. This led to violent protests in which 100 people died and more than 500 were injured.

Wine was arrested again on 30 December on Kalangala Island, where a rally he was holding was cut short by police. Police broke up the rally using tear gas and Wine was put under house arrest at his home in Kampala. During his campaign, several aides, bodyguards and members of his entourage have been arrested, jailed and killed.

Social media and internet block
On 13 January 2021, a day before the elections and a day after Facebook closed "fake" accounts it said were linked to the government, the communications regulator in Uganda ordered all telecoms firms to block access to social media and messaging apps in retaliation. The Ugandan government denied the charges and accused Facebook of meddling in the election saying "I think they are playing the usual games, we know that they have a side in this election perhaps."

At 5 pm on 13 January, the government ordered a complete internet shut-down, which came into effect at 7 pm. Amnesty International's deputy regional director condemned the move, saying that it was "clearly intended to silence the few accredited election observers, opposition politicians, human rights defenders, activists, journalists, and bloggers who are monitoring the elections".

Allegations of fraud
On 15 January (the day after the election), Bobi Wine announced that Ugandan security forces had surrounded and breached his compound after he had alleged that the elections had been "marred by fraud and violence".
Wine said he had video proof of voting fraud and would share the videos as soon as internet connections were restored. He accused Museveni of fabricating the results and called the poll "the most fraudulent election in the history of Uganda... The entire process has been conducted in [the] dark and it lacks transparency," Katana, head agent of Bobi Wine's National Unity Platform, said "From the beginning, we were assured by the electoral commission that each candidate or their agents will receive copies of the results from the districts before they are transmitted to the national tally centre, so we are able to verify when they are reading here – and that was not done."
On February 1, the legal team for opposition leader Bobi Wine filed a Supreme Court lawsuit, asking it to declare President Yoweri Museveni's re-election rigged. George Musisi, a member of Wine's legal team, said that the National United Platform (NUP) had amassed "glaring evidence" proving that the election result was invalid. "There was outright ballot-stuffing, there was intimidation of NUP agents and supporters, some were arrested on the eve of [last month's] election, there was pre-ticking of ballots," said Musisi.

Results

President
Justice Simon Mugenyi Byabakama, chair of the Electoral Commission, declared Museveni the winner of the presidential election on 16 January, stating that he won almost 59% of the vote, with Wine taking 35%. Voter turnout was 57%. Byabakama said that it had been a peaceful election. Speaking before the results were announced, Wine told reporters that it was "the most fraudulent election in the history of Uganda" and also accused Museveni of putting him "under siege", as security forces surrounded his home. Museveni denied these claims in a televised address after being proclaimed the winner, saying that the votes had been machine-counted and that it "may turn out to be the most cheating-free election since 1962". Byabakama challenged Wine to provide evidence for his allegations of fraud.

Parliament

International reactions
Tanzania's president John Magufuli congratulated Museveni on his reelection victory. Kenya's President Uhuru Kenyatta congratulated Museveni, and in a statement published as a Facebook post, termed President Yoweri Museveni's re-election as a testimony of the confidence the people of Uganda have in his leadership. The post (specifically the part that mentioned Museveni having announced a cabinet shuffle) was flagged by Facebook and termed as "false information" and was subsequently deleted by the page administrators. The same congratulatory message was published on State House Kenya's Twitter handle and subsequently deleted. Abdel Fattah al-Burhan, the head of Sudan's Sovereignty Council and the nation's transitional head of state, also congratulated Museveni.

The United States and European Union called for an investigation into abuses of power by the government and violence during the election. The United States Department of State also called on Ugandan authorities to investigate election "irregularities," while the EU Council of Ministers stated that "opposition candidates were harassed by security forces, the media was suppressed by the government, and observers' offices were raided." The European Parliament passed a resolution on February 11, 2021 indicating that the election was not democratic and the security forces used excessive force. The resolution stated that it "expects all election challenges and complaints to be addressed in an independent and transparent manner". It also stated that hundreds of NUP supporters had been abducted by security forces operatives and an unclear number of them were "still being forcibly detained or are missing". It was later confirmed that many NUP members disappeared or were detained.

References

External links
 Electoral Commission of Uganda

Uganda
General election
Uganda
Presidential elections in Uganda
Election and referendum articles with incomplete results